Hulchul is a 2004 Indian Hindi-language romantic action comedy drama film directed by Priyadarshan. The film is a remake of the 1991 Malayalam film Godfather. The film stars Akshaye Khanna, Kareena Kapoor, Sunil Shetty, Jackie Shroff, Arshad Warsi, Amrish Puri, Paresh Rawal, Arbaaz Khan, Shakti Kapoor, Farha Naaz, and Laxmi.

Plot

Angar Chand has a rich lifestyle in a small Indian town with his wife and four sons. The eldest son Balram falls for Dhamini, who reciprocates his feelings. Though her mother Laxmi opposes this, Angar wants their wedding. Dhamini's dad Sanjeev in anger accidentally kills Angar's wife Parvati. Dhamini is forcefully married off to Kashinath Pathak. Enraged, Angar kills Sanjeev and is jailed for 14 years.

14 years later
Bailed, Angar returns home to declare women won't be allowed in his property, posting a sign on the front gate and forbidding his sons to ever marry.

9 years later

Dhamini's daughter Anjali is in college with Jai, Angar's youngest son. Angar learns Anjali will marry the state's Home Minister. Still having a grudge, he breaks the wedding by political pressure. Anjali and Jai seek revenge but eventually fall in love. Angar's second son Kishan turns out leading a dual life; he is married to dance teacher Gopi since 7 years and has 2 children. Angar finds out and kicks Kishan and Jai out as Jai supports him. Laxmi fixes Anjali's marriage with her lawyer's son Sattu with the help of Angaar Chand, so that Jai will not enter the wedding.

On the wedding day, Jai enters the venue by help from Veeru (Laxmi's son),  knocks Sattu unconscious and dresses as the groom. He goes through marriage rituals but reveals himself at end of the ceremony, finally marrying Anjali. She asks Laxmi to end the feud. Jai asks Angar to forgive him, who leaves and contemplates all his sons' actions. Anjali and Gopi are finally welcomed into the family, with the four sons.

Cast
Akshaye Khanna as Jai A.Chand 
Kareena Kapoor as Anjali 
Amrish Puri as Angar Chand 
Paresh Rawal as Kishan A.Chand / Murari
Jackie Shroff as Balram "Balli" A.Chand
Suniel Shetty as Veer "Veeru"
Arbaaz Khan as Shakti A.Chand 
Arshad Warsi as Lucky, Jai's friend.
Lakshmi as Laxmi Devi Sanjeev Chawla
Farah Naaz as Gopi Kishan Chand Jakhar
Shakti Kapoor as Kashinath Pathak
Manoj Joshi as Advocate Namdev Mishra                                                                    
Asrani as Advocate Milind Sharma
Akhilendra Mishra as Surajbhan "Surya" Chawla
Deep Dhillon as Pratapbhan Chawla
Upasana Singh as Ramila Surajbhan Chawla
Ada Puri as Raakhi Pratapbhan Chawla
Sharad Kelkar as Dr. Satyendra "Sattu" Mishra 
Mumaith Khan in song "Lut Gayee"
Zubein Khan in song "Lut Gayee"
Deepali Shaw in song "Lut Gayee"

Soundtrack
According to the Indian trade website Box Office India, with around 10,00,000 units sold, this film's soundtrack album was the year's fourteenth highest-selling. The song "Rafta Rafta" is a Hindi remake of the song "Aasai Aasai" with a slight change in tune from the 2003 Tamil film Dhool, another film where the music was composed by Vidyasagar. The song 'Ishq Mein Pyaar Mein' is also a remake of the Tamil song Thaamara poovukku from the 1995 Tamil film Pasumpon, which also had music by Vidyasagar.  The lyrics are penned by Sameer.

Reception 
It received generally positive reviews, who appreciated the performances of cast, humor, and cinematography, but criticized for its screenplay, narration, cliched plot, and running time.

Awards 
50th Filmfare Awards:

Nominated

 Best Comedian – Arshad Warsi
 Best Comedian – Paresh Rawal

References

External links 
 
 
 

2004 films
2000s Hindi-language films
Films directed by Priyadarshan
2004 romantic comedy-drama films
Hindi remakes of Malayalam films
Films scored by Vidyasagar
Films scored by Surinder Sodhi
Films shot in Switzerland
Indian romantic comedy-drama films
Films shot in Mumbai
2004 comedy films
2004 drama films